Cork Albert Quay railway station was on the Cork, Bandon and South Coast Railway in County Cork, Ireland.

History

The station opened on 8 December 1851 with services to Bandon, County Cork. From 1866 to 1879 and 1925 to 1935 it was also the terminus of the Cork and Macroom Direct Railway.

Regular passenger services were withdrawn on 1 April 1961.

Building
In the early 21st century some of the remaining listed/protected structures bordering the Albert Quay station were incorporated into the Enterprise Ireland "Webworks" office development on Eglinton Street and Albert Quay. This included the building formerly housing the CIÉ area offices, which is now known as Albert Quay House.

Routes

Gallery

Further reading

References

Disused railway stations in County Cork
Railway stations opened in 1851
Railway stations closed in 1961
1851 establishments in Ireland

Railway stations in the Republic of Ireland opened in 1851